Paintersville is an unincorporated community in Sacramento County, California, United States. The community is named after Levi Painter, who laid out lots in the community in 1879.

References

Unincorporated communities in Sacramento County, California
Unincorporated communities in California